Aborn is a surname. Notable people with the surname include:

Lora Aborn (1907–2005), American classical composer
Richard Aborn (born 1952), American attorney

See also
Aborn Opera Company, operated by Milton Aborn and Sargent Aborn